Wilburn Tucker (August 10, 1920 – October 6, 1980) was an American football and baseball player and coach. He was the head football coach at Tennessee Tech from 1954 to 1967, leading the team to five Ohio Valley Conference (OVC) championships. He was later inducted into both the Tennessee Tech and OVC Halls of Fame.

Early years
Tucker attended Tennessee Polytechnic Institute, now known as Tennessee Technological University, in the early 1940s. He played both baseball and football before graduating in 1943. He then served in the United States Navy during World War II. After the war, Tucker received a master's degree from the University of Tennessee.

Coaching career
Tucker returned to Tennessee Polytechnic as the freshman football coach, holding that position from 1946 to 1951. He next served as Tennessee Tech's backfield coach and scout during the 1952 and 1953 seasons. He also served as the school's baseball coach from 1948 to 1954. He compiled a 70–39 record as the school's baseball coach.

In January 1954, Tucker was promoted to head football coach at Tennessee Polytechnic. He held that position from 1954 to 1967, compiling a record of 70–66–5 as head coach and led the team to five Ohio Valley Conference championships: 1955, 1957, 1959, 1960, and 1961. In December 1967, he was fired after his 1967 team posted a 3–7 record.

Later years and honors
After his coaching career, Tucker operated a sporting goods store in Cookeville, Tennessee.

Tucker was inducted into the Tennessee Tech Hall of Fame in 1977. He died in October 1980 at age 59 at Cookeville General Hospital.

Tucker was posthumously inducted into the Ohio Valley Conference Hall of Fame in 1987. Tucker Stadium at Tennessee Tech is named after him.

Head coaching record

Football

References

External links
 

1920 births
1980 deaths
Tennessee Tech Golden Eagles baseball coaches
Tennessee Tech Golden Eagles baseball players
Tennessee Tech Golden Eagles football coaches
Tennessee Tech Golden Eagles football players
United States Navy officers
United States Navy personnel of World War I
University of Tennessee alumni
People from Rutherford County, Tennessee
Coaches of American football from Tennessee
Players of American football from Tennessee
Baseball coaches from Tennessee
Baseball players from Tennessee
Military personnel from Tennessee